Billy Miske, alias The Saint Paul Thunderbolt (April 12, 1894 – January 1, 1924), was a professional boxer from Saint Paul, Minnesota. During his tenure as a pugilist he had multiple-bout series with a plethora of all-time greats including Harry Greb, Jack Dempsey, Jack Dillon, Tommy Gibbons, Bill Brennan and Battling Levinsky, among others. Despite a career shortened by illness and an early death, statistical website BoxRec still lists Miske as the No. 26 ranked heavyweight of all-time.

Professional boxing career

An American of German descent, Miske stood at 6'0" and over the course of his career weighed between 158 and 190 lbs.  He was managed by John Pearl "J.P" Smith (1913–18) and Jack Reddy (1918–23).

Miske was born in St. Paul, Minnesota. He began his career as a middleweight.  During the course of his career, he competed successfully as a light-heavyweight and heavyweight, defeating many well known fighters.  On September 6, 1920, Miske lost to Jack Dempsey in the third round of a fight to decide the World Heavyweight Boxing title.  It was the first heavyweight title match to be broadcast on radio, and it was the only time Billy Miske was ever knocked out.

Illness and death
Miske fought his last bout against Bill Brennan, whom he met on November 7, 1923.  At this point in his life, Miske knew he did not have much time left before his kidneys gave out (doctors had told him he had only months to live because of his Bright's Disease). Due to his family's economic situation, however, Miske decided he had to step into the ring one more time.  His health prevented him from training for the fight. Amazingly, though, Miske knocked Brennan out in the fourth round. Miske died in St. Paul, Minnesota of kidney failure less than 2 months later on January 1, 1924.

Legacy
Miske's enduring legacy is that of an underappreciated fighter.  It is argued that Miske deserved, but never received, title matches against Jack Dillon, Battling Levinsky and Georges Carpentier.  His three recorded losses are against Hall of Famers Jack Dempsey, Kid Norfolk and Tommy Gibbons, while his list of defeated opponents boasts some of the most storied names in boxing history.  Miske's final professional record was 72-15-14 with 33 wins by knockout. On December 8, 2009, it was announced that Miske would be inducted into the International Boxing Hall of Fame in 2010.  On September 28, 2012 Miske was inducted into the Minnesota Boxing Hall of Fame.

Notable bouts 

| style="text-align:center;" colspan="7"|
|-  style="text-align:center; background:#e3e3e3;"
|  style="border-style:none none solid solid; "|Result
|  style="border-style:none none solid solid; "|Opponent
|  style="border-style:none none solid solid; "|Type
|  style="border-style:none none solid solid; "|Rd., Time
|  style="border-style:none none solid solid; "|Date
|  style="border-style:none none solid solid; "|Location
|  style="border-style:none none solid solid; "|Notes
|- align=center
|Loss
|align=left| Tommy Gibbons
|
|
|
|align=left|
|align=left|
|- align=center
|Win
|align=left| Tommy Gibbons
|
|
|
|align=left|
|align=left|
|- align=center
|Loss
|align=left| Jack Dempsey
|
|
|
|align=left|
|align=left|
|- align=center
|Loss
|align=left| Battling Levinsky
|
|
|
|align=left|
|align=left|
|- align=center
|style="background:#abcdef;"|Draw
|align=left| Tommy Gibbons
|
|
|
|align=left|
|align=left|
|- align=center
|Loss
|align=left| Kid Norfolk
|
|
|
|align=left|
|align=left|
|- align=center
|Loss
|align=left| Harry Greb
|
|
|
|align=left|
|align=left|
|- align=center
|Loss
|align=left| Jack Dempsey
|
|
|
|align=left|
|align=left|
|- align=center
|Loss
|align=left| Harry Greb
|
|
|
|align=left|
|align=left|
|- align=center
|Win
|align=left| Gunboat Smith
|
|
|
|align=left|
|align=left|
|- align=center
|style="background:#abcdef;"|Draw
|align=left| Jack Dempsey
|
|
|
|align=left|
|align=left|
|- align=center
|Win
|align=left| Gunboat Smith
|
|
|
|align=left|
|align=left|
|- align=center
|Win
|align=left| Jack Dillon
|
|
|
|align=left|
|align=left|
|- align=center
|Loss
|align=left| Kid Norfolk
|
|
|
|align=left|
|align=left|
|- align=center
|Loss
|align=left| Battling Levinsky
|
|
|
|align=left|
|align=left|
|- align=center
|Win
|align=left| Jack Dillon
|
|
|
|align=left|
|align=left|
|- align=center
|Win
|align=left| Jack Dillon
|
|
|
|align=left|
|align=left|
|- align=center
|Win
|align=left| Battling Levinsky
|
|
|
|align=left|
|align=left|
|- align=center
|Win
|align=left| Battling Levinsky
|
|
|
|align=left|
|align=left|
|- align=center
|Loss
|align=left| Jack Dillon
|
|
|
|align=left|
|align=left|
|- align=center
|Win
|align=left| Jack Dillon
|
|
|
|align=left|
|align=left|
|- align=center
|Loss
|align=left| Tommy Gibbons
|
|
|
|align=left|
|align=left|
|- align=center
|Win
|align=left| Mike O'Dowd
|
|
|
|align=left|
|align=left|
|- align=center
|style="background:#abcdef;"|Draw
|align=left| Harry Greb
|
|
|
|align=left|
|align=left|
|- align=center
|Loss
|align=left| Tommy Gibbons
|
|
|
|align=left|
|align=left|
|- align=center
|style="background:#ddd;"|NC
|align=left| Mike O'Dowd
|
|
|
|align=left|
|align=left|

References

External links
Rick Reilly Sports Illustrated Article
International Boxing Hall of Fame's article about Billy Miske 
1955 Newspaper Article
His Daughters  page
Article at CyberBoxingZone Journal
 
1924 Newspaper Article
1952 Newspaper Article
Amazing Sports Stories - "Billy Miske: Dead Man Fighting"
 Biography: 'Billy Miske: The St. Paul Thunderbolt' by Clay Moyle
 Novel: 'The Final Round' by Gary W. Allison

1894 births
1924 deaths
Heavyweight boxers
Boxers from Saint Paul, Minnesota
Deaths from kidney failure
American male boxers